Ngwesaung Subtownship is a subtownship of Pathein Township in Pathein District, Ayeyarwady Region, Myanmar. The namesake of the subtownship is Ngwesaung, a popular beach resort with a white sand shore. The subtownship is relatively urban with 10,732 people (27.3% of the population) living within the town of Ngwesaung.

Geography
The subtownship is coastal, bordering the Bay of Bengal to its west. To its north, it borders Shwethaungyan subtownship and to its east, the remaining parts of Pathein Township. To its south, it borders Ngapudaw Township.

Outside of its coastal areas, the subtownship is largely undeveloped and is home to a diverse variety of flora and fauna. The 39 primary tree species identified by the township include trees include hardwoods like teak and Burmese ironwood, fruit trees like mango and tamarind as well as coastal tress like Coconut trees. Prominent animals in the township include elephants, gaur, black bears, iguana. The Chaungtha reserve forest and the Sinma Beach Forest lie on the eastern and southern boundary of the town of Ngwesaung respectively. They are home to unique coastal bamboo species like Bambusa burmanica.

References

Subtownships of Ayeyarwady Region